Manaye Fantu is an Ethiopian professional footballer, who plays as a forward for Defence F.C.

International career
In January 2014, the coach Sewnet Bishaw invited him to be a part of the Ethiopia squad for the 2014 African Nations Championship. The team was eliminated in the group stages after losing to Congo, Libya and Ghana.

References

Living people
Ethiopian footballers
Ethiopia A' international footballers
2014 African Nations Championship players
Defence Force F.C. players
1990 births
Place of birth missing (living people)
Association football forwards
Ethiopia international footballers